This is a list of notable Hispanic and Latino Americans: citizens or residents of the United States with origins in Latin America or Spain. The following groups are officially designated as "Spanish/Hispanic/Latino": Mexican American, (Stateside) Puerto Rican, Cuban American, Dominican American, Costa Rican American, Guatemalan American, Honduran American, Nicaraguan American, Panamanian American, Salvadoran American, Argentine American, Bolivian American, Brazilian American, Chilean American, Colombian American, Ecuadorian American, Paraguayan American, Peruvian American, Spanish American, Uruguayan American, and Venezuelan American. However, Hispanic or Latino people can have any ancestry.

Arts

Dance
Alec Lazo, ballroom dancer and instructor; Cuban American
José Limón, modern dancer and choreographer; Mexican American
Danielle Polanco, dancer and choreographer; Dominican-Puerto Rican American
Augie & Margo Rodriguez, celebrity performers starting with the Mambo days of the 1950s

Actors 

 Rita Hayworth (Spanish father)
 Jay Hernandez
 Lalo Ríos
 Jennifer Lopez
 Cameron Díaz (Cuban father)
 Jorge García
 Joshua Gomez
 Michelle Rodriguez
 George Lopez
 Gina Rodriguez
 Isabela Moner
 Jason Genao
 Michael Trevino
 Bella Thorne
 Sofia Vergara
 Michael Peña
 Edward James Olmos

Cartoonists and animators
 Sergio Aragonés, Spanish born-American cartoonist and writer known for his contributions to Mad Magazine and creator of the comic book Groo the Wanderer."
 José Argüelles (1939–2011), American New Age author and artist. His father was Spanish.
 Antonio Prohías, Cuban American creator of Mad Magazines Spy vs Spy series
 Joe Quesada, Cuban American comic book editor, writer producer and artist
 Michael Peraza, Cuban American animator, art director, conceptual artist and historian of animation, who has worked for The Walt Disney Company, Fox Features, and Warner Brothers.

Directors, screenwriters and producers
 Félix Enríquez Alcalá (born 1951) – American television and film director of Mexican descent
 Kevin Alejandro (born 1976) – American actor and film director of Mexican descent
 Natalia Almada (born 1974) – Mexican-born American documentary filmmaker
 Cristela Alonzo (born 1979) – American comedian, actor, writer and producer of Mexican descent
 John A. Alonzo (1934–2001) – American cinematographer of Mexican descent, Academy Award nominee and Emmy Award winner
 Elisa Marina Alvarado – American director of Mexican and Cuban descent
 Rafael Alvarez (born May 24, 1958) – American screenwriter. He is of Spanish partial descent
 Robert Alvarez (born 1948) – American animator, television director, and writer of Mexican descent
 Michael Arias (born 1968) – American anime filmmaker based in Japan. He is of Mexican descent
 Eva Aridjis (born 1974) – American film director, screenwriter, TV writer of Mexican descent
 Miguel Arteta (born 1965) – Puerto Rican director of film and television, known for his independent film Chuck & Buck (2000), for which he received the Independent Spirit John Cassavetes Award, and Cedar Rapids. He is son of a Peruvian father and a Spanish mother
 Ozzie Alfonso – Cuban American TV director, writer, producer; directed Sesame Street in the 1970s; senior producer, writer, and director of 3-2-1 Contact in the 1980s; freelanced for many clients; adjunct college professor at St. John's University
 Elizabeth Avellán (born 1960) – Venezuelan-born American film producer
 Ivonne Belén – Puerto Rican documentary film director and producer
 Roberto Benabib (born 1959) – Mexican-born American television writer, producer, and film director, Emmy Award nominee
 J. Robert Bren (1903–1981) – Mexican-born American screenwriter and producers, wrote 30 films between the '30s and '50s
 Edward Carrere (1906–1084) – Mexican-born America art director, Academy Award winner and two-time nominee
 Rafael Casal (born 1985) – American writer, actor, producer, and showrunner. He is of Irish, Spanish, and Cuban descent.
 Natalie Chaidez (born 1950) – American writer and producer of Mexican and Irish descent, Emmy Award nominee
 Migdia Chinea – Cuban American film director, writer, producer (When it rains..., The Incredible Hulk)
 Fernanda Coppel – Mexican-born American screenwriter and playwright
 Julio Hernández Cordón (born 1975) – American director and screenwriter of Mexican descent
 Manny Coto – American of Cuban origin. He is executive producer (24), writer (24, Star Trek: Enterprise)
 Terri Doty (born 1984) – American animation voice actress, voice director, and writer of Mexican descent
 René Echevarria – American of Cuban origin. He is a writer (Star Trek: The Next Generation, Star Trek: Deep Space Nine, Medium), co-creator of The 4400
 Mike Elizalde (born 1960) – Mexican-born American special makeup effects artist, Academy Award nominee
 Moctezuma Esparza (born 1949) – American producer of Mexican descent, Academy Award and Emmy Award nominee
 Carlos López Estrada (born 1988) – Mexican-born American music video, commercial, and film director
 Hampton Fancher (born 1938) – American producer and screenwriter of Mexican and Danish descent
 America Ferrera (born 1984) – American actress, producer, and director of Honduran descent
 William A. Fraker (1923–2010) – American cinematographer, director, and producer of Mexican descent, six-time Academy Award nominee
 Andy García – Cuban-born American director (Lost City)
 Dany Garcia – Cuban American film producer
 Nick Gomez (born 1963) – American film director to a Chilean father
 Alfonso Gomez-Rejon (born 1972) – American film and television director of Mexican descent, two-time Emmy Award nominee
 Heather Hemmens – American actress, film director and producer; born to a Costa Rican mother
 Silvio Horta – Cuban American. He is a creator and writer (Ugly Betty), writer (Urban Legends, Jake 2.0)
 Leon Ichaso – Cuban American. He is a director/screenwriter (El Super), director (Ali: An American Hero, Crossover Dreams, Piñero, El Cantante)
 Valentina L. Garza – writer and producer for The Simpsons (Cuban American)
 Neal Jimenez (born 1960) – American screenwriter and film director of Mexican descent
 Emile Kuri (1907–2000) – Mexican-born American set decorator, won two Academy Awards and was nominated for six more in the category Best Art Direction
 William Douglas Lansford (1922–2013) – American screenwriter, film producer, and author of English and Mexican descent
 Paul Lerpae (1900–1989) – Mexican-born American special effects artist, Academy Award nominee
 Lisa Loomer – playwright and screenwriter of Spanish and Romanian ancestry
 Jenée LaMarque (born 1980) – American writer and director of Mexican descent
 Bill Melendez (1916–2008) – Mexican-born American animator, director, and producer, eight-time Emmy Award winner and Academy Award nominee
 Steven C. Melendez (born 1945) – American animator, director, and producer of Mexican descent, Emmy Award winner (son of Bill Melendez)
 Linda Mendoza (born 1950) – American television and film director of Mexican descent
 Joe Menendez – Cuban American; TV and film director (Ladrón que roba a ladrón, From Dusk Till Dawn: The Series, 12 Monkeys, Queen of the South)
 Adrian Molina (born 1985) – American screenwriter, storyboard artist, and animation director of Mexican descent, Emmy Award nominee
 Sylvia Morales (born 1943) – American director, writer, and producer of Mexican descent, Emmy Award nominee
 S.J. Main Muñoz (born 1978) – American filmmaker to a Costa Rican mother
 Gregory Nava (born 1949) – American director, producer and screenwriter of Mexican descent, Academy Award and Emmy Award nominee
 Edward James Olmos (born 1947) – American director and actor of Mexican descent, Emmy and Golden Globe winner
 Roberto Orci (born 1973) – Mexican-born American screenwriter and producer (Star Trek, The Proposal) and writer (Transformers, Eagle Eye, Star Trek)
 Manuel Perez (animator) (1914–1981) – American animator and animation director of Mexican descent
 Richard Peña – American film festival organizer, New York Film Festival; professor of film studies at Columbia University
 Tony Plana (born 1952) – Cuban-born American actor and director (Ugly Betty)
 Polish brothers – American screenwriters and producers to a mother of Mexican descent
 Lourdes Portillo (born 1944) – Mexican-born American filmmaker
 Gabby Revilla – Nicaraguan-born American film director and producer and writer
 Georgina Garcia Riedel – American filmmaker and scriptwriter of Mexican descent
 Jonas Rivera (born 1971) – American producer with Pixar films of Mexican descent, Academy Award winner
 Robert Rodríguez (born 1968) – American director, producer and screenwriter of Mexican descent
 Phil Roman (born 1930) – American animation director of Mexican descent, founder of Film Roman animation studio, six-time Emmy Award winner
 George A. Romero – American film director, screenwriter and editor (Night of the Living Dead, Dawn of the Dead), creator of the Living Dead film series; son of a Cuban-born father of Castilian Spanish parentage and a Lithuanian American mother
 Bernardo Ruiz – documentary filmmaker of Mexican origin
 Craig Saavedra (born 1963) – American producer and director of Mexican descent, two-time Tony Award nominee
 Victor Salva (born 1958) – American filmmaker of Mexican descent
 Jesús Salvador Treviño (born 1946) – American television director of Mexican descent, three-time Emmy Award nominee
 Eduardo Sánchez – Cuban-born American director (The Blair Witch Project)
 Johnny Sanchez (born 1958) – American actor, writer, and film producer
 Amy Serrano – director, cinematographer, and writer (The Sugar Babies), producer of documentary films, poet (Cuban American)
 Jaume Collet-Serra (born March 23, 1974) – Spanish-born American film director and producer
 Tony Taccone – American theater director; of Italian and a Puerto Rican descent
 Jessy Terrero – Dominican-born American film and music video director
 Carles Torrens (born 1984) – Spanish-born film and television director, screenwriter, editor, and producer
 Gabriel Traversari (born 1963) – American actor and director of Nicaraguan descent
 Rose Troche (born 1964) – American film and television director, television producer, and screenwriter of Puerto Rican descent
 Jose Luis Valenzuela – American theater and film director of Mexican origin
 Jeff Valdez (born 1956) – American producer, writer, and studio executive of Mexican origin
 Luis Valdez (born 1940) – American playwright and director of Mexican descent
 Joseph Vasquez (1962–1995) – American independent filmmaker
 Chris Weitz (born 1969) – American writer, producer, director; grandmother was Mexican actress Lupita Tovar
 Paul Weitz (born 1965) – writer, producer, director; grandmother was Mexican actress Lupita Tovar
 Hype Williams (born 1970) – American music video director, film director, film producer, and screenwriter. He is of African-American and Honduran descent
 Rafael Yglesias (born May 12, 1954, New York) – American novelist and screenwriter. His parents were the novelists Jose Yglesias and Helen Yglesias.
 Rudy Zamora (1910–1989) – Mexican-born American animator and animation director, Emmy Award nominee

Visual arts
Laura Aguilar, artist, photographer; Mexican American
Celia Alvarez Muñoz, artist; Mexican American
Judy Baca, artist; Mexican American
Jean-Michel Basquiat, artist; Puerto Rican-Haitian American
José Bernal, artist
Rosa Maria Calles, artist and playwright
Harry Gamboa Jr., artist; Mexican American
Soraida Martinez, artist, creator of Verdadism; Puerto Rican (American)
Franck de Las Mercedes, painter; Nicaraguan American
Antonio Roybal, painter and sculptor; Mexican American
Richard Serra, sculptor
John August Swanson, painter; Mexican American
Jhonen Vasquez, cartoonist, comic book artist; Mexican American

Music
See Latin music in the United States

Alphabetized by surname
Miguel del Aguila, composer; Uruguayan American
Christina Aguilera, singer; Ecuadorian American
Julia Alvarez, author; Dominican American
Tatyana Ali, singer; Panamanian American
Anacani, singer; Mexican American
Tom Araya, bassist and vocalist of thrash metal band Slayer; Chilean American
David Archuleta, American Idol finalist, singer and actor; Honduran American
AZ, rapper from Brooklyn, New York; Dominican American
B-Real, rapper from Cypress Hill; Cuban-Mexican American
Baby Bash, R&B singer; Mexican American
Joan Baez, folk singer; Mexican American
Devendra Banhart, freak folk singer, half-Venezuelan American
Lloyd Banks, rapper, member of G-Unit; Puerto Rican (American)
Big Pun; Puerto Rican (American)
Sergio Andrade, musician (bassist founder of LIFEHOUSE); Guatemalan American
Cedric Bixler-Zavala, lead singer for At the Drive-In and Mars Volta; Mexican American
Rubén Blades, singer and actor; Panamanian American
Ryan Cabrera, singer; Colombian American
Irene Cara, Grammy-nominated singer; Cuban American
Mariah Carey, singer; Venezuelan American
Vikki Carr, singer; Mexican American
Ingrid Chavez, vocalist and songwriter; Mexican American
Chayanne; Puerto Rican (American)
Chingo Bling, rapper; Mexican American
Willy Chirino, singer; Cuban American
Lisa Coleman, musician/composer, member of Prince and The Revolution and Wendy & Lisa
Nichole Cordova, singer; Spanish American
Manny Marroquin, Grammy Award-winning mixer/engineer; Guatemalan American
Celia Cruz, multiple Grammy-winning singer; Cuban American
Cuban Link, rapper; Cuban American
Daddy Yankee, Reggaeton rapper; Puerto Rican (American)
DJ Kane, singer; Mexican American
Paula DeAnda, R&B, pop singer; Mexican American
Kat DeLuna, pop singer; Dominican American
Howie Dorough, singer, Backstreet Boys; Puerto Rican (American)
Fabolous, rapper; Dominican American
Fat Joe; Puerto Rican-Cuban American
Fergie, singer, Black Eyed Peas; Mexican American
 Aundrea Fimbres, singer, Danity Kane; Mexican American
DJ Flex/Nigga, singer; Panamanian American
Luis Fonsi, singer; Puerto Rican (American)
Frankie J, singer; Mexican American
Mike Fuentes, drummer, percussionist, vocalist in the group Pierce the Veil; Mexican American
Vic Fuentes, singer-songwriter; Pierce the Veil; Mexican American
Lalo Guerrero, musician; Mexican American
Albert Hammond Jr., singer for The Strokes; Peruvian-Argentine American
Marques Houston, singer; Mexican American
Vanessa Hudgens, singer and actress; Spanish-Filipino American
Ivy Queen, Reggaeton rapper; Puerto Rican (American)
Jim Jones, rapper; Puerto Rican (American)
Juanes, pop-rock singer; Colombian American
La India, singer; Puerto Rican (American)
La Lupe, singer and gay icon; Cuban American
Héctor Lavoe; Puerto Rican (American)
Adrianne Leon, actress, singer-songwriter, guitarist; Puerto Rican-Ecuadorian American
Lil Rob, rapper; Mexican American
Dave Lombardo, drummer of thrash metal band Slayer; Cuban American
Olivia Longott, rapper; Cuban American
Jennifer Lopez, singer; Puerto Rican (American), Nuyorican
Demi Lovato, singer and actress; Mexican American
Lumidee, singer; Puerto Rican (American)
Víctor Manuelle, Salsa singer; Puerto Rican (American)
Marc Anthony, singer, actor; Puerto Rican (American), Nuyorican
Martika, Grammy-nominated singer; Cuban American
MC Magic, R&B singer; Mexican American
Angie Martinez, radio personality; Puerto Rican (American)
 Cruz Martínez, producer, songwriter and keyboardist from group Los Super Reyes; Mexican American
 S.A. Martinez, lead singer of 311; Mexican American
Ricky Martin, singer; Puerto Rican (American)
Natalie Mejia, singer, Girlicious; Cuban-Mexican American
Christina Milian, singer and actress; Cuban American
Chino Moreno, lead singer of Deftones; Mexican American
Chris Montez; Mexican American
Dave Navarro, lead guitar Jane's Addiction; Mexican American
Asia Nitollano, Member of The Pussycat Dolls; Mexican-Puerto Rican American
N.O.R.E, hip hop recording artist; Puerto Rican (American)
Colby O'Donis, singer; Puerto Rican (American)
Don Omar, Reggaeton Rapper; Puerto Rican (American)
Jeannie Ortega singer; Puerto Rican (American)
Karina Pasian, singer; Dominican-Armenian American
Pee Wee, singer and actor; Mexican American
Jennifer Peña, singer; Mexican American
Chris Pérez, guitarist from group Kumbia All Starz; Mexican American
Rudy Pérez, composer and producer; Cuban American
Pitbull, rapper; Cuban American
Carlos Ponce, singer; Puerto Rican-Cuban American
Tito Puente; Puerto Rican (American)
A.B. Quintanilla III, producer, songwriter and bass guitarist from group Kumbia All Starz; Mexican American
Gabriel Ríos, pop singer; Puerto Rican (American)
Jenni Rivera, was an American singer, songwriter, actress, television producer, spokesperson, philanthropist and entrepreneur
Zack de la Rocha vocalist, Rage Against the Machine; Mexican American
Albita Rodríguez, Grammy-winning singer; Cuban American
Omar Rodríguez-López, lead guitar for At the Drive-In and Mars Volta; Puerto Rican (American)
Linda Ronstadt, rock singer; Mexican American
Paulina Rubio, singer; Mexican American
Michele Ruiz, broadcaster and CEO SaberHacer.com; Panamanian American
Hope Sandoval, singer, Mazzy Star; Mexican American
Sonny Sandoval lead singer of P.O.D.; Mexican American
Carlos Santana, musician; Mexican American
Juelz Santana, rapper and member of The Diplomats; Dominican American
 Kike Santander, composer and producer; Colombian
Gustavo Santaolalla, composer, winner of two Oscars for "Brokeback Mountain' and 'Babel'; Argentine American
Gilberto Santa Rosa, Salsa singer; Puerto Rican (American)
Gabe Saporta, lead singer of Cobra Starship; Uruguayan American
Jon Secada, two-time Grammy-winning singer; Cuban American
Selena, singer; Mexican American
Shakira, singer; Colombian American
Sheila E., percussionist; Mexican American
South Park Mexican, rapper; Mexican American
T-Bone (rapper), rapper; Nicaraguan-Salvadoran American
Taboo, rapper, Black Eyed Peas; Mexican American
Abel Talamantez, singer and dancer from group Los Super Reyes; Mexican American
Olga Tañon, merengue singer; Puerto Rican (American)
Thalía, singer and actress; Mexican American
Melody Thornton, singer, Pussycat Dolls; Mexican American
Tony Touch, DJ; Puerto Rican (American)
Robert Trujillo, bassist of thrash metal band Metallica; Mexican American
Jose Valdes, jazz pianist; Mexican American
Ritchie Valens, singer; Mexican American
Jaci Velasquez, singer and actress; Mexican American
Julieta Venegas, singer; Mexican American
Carlos Vives, singer; Colombian American
Hype Williams, music video and film director; Honduran American
JR Writer rapper and member of The Diplomats; Dominican American
Selena Gomez, singer, fashion designer, actress, and record producer; Mexican American
Ricardo Arjona, Grammy-winning singer; Guatemalan

Groups
Aventura, Bachata; Dominican-Puerto Rican American
Crooked Stilo, brother Latino rappers; Salvadoran American
Cypress Hill, Rap group; Mexican-Cuban-Puerto Rican American
El Gran Combo; Puerto Rican (American)
Intocable, Tejano group; Mexican American
Kumbia All Starz, Cumbia group; Mexican American
Kumbia Kings, Cumbia group; Mexican American
La Mafia, Tejano group; Mexican American
Los Illegals, punk rock band; Mexican American
Los Lobos, R&B, Rock band; Mexican American
Los Lonely Boys R&B, Rock band; Mexican American
Los Super Reyes, Cumbia group; Mexican American
Luny Tunes, production duo; Dominican American
Nina Sky, twin sister singers; Puerto Rican (American)
Prima J, Pop/Hip-Hop Duo; Mexican American
Question Mark & the Mysterians, punk rock band; Mexican American
Thee Midniters, rock and soul group; Mexican American
Voices of Theory, R&B boy group
Wisin & Yandel; Puerto Rican (American)

Reality show stars
 David Archuleta - American Idol contestant; Honduran American
 Amanda Avila - American Idol contestant; Mexican American
 Christopher Badano - Uruguayan American, American Idol (season 1) contestant
 John Paul (J.P.) Calderon - Survivor: Cook Islands contestant; Costa Rican American
 Jessie Camacho - Survivor: Africa contestant; Puerto Rican American
 Jason Castro, Colombian American, American Idol (season 7) contestant
 Rodolfo (Rudy) Cárdenas - Venezuelan American, Top 24 contestant, American Idol (season 6)
 Jose "Pepi" Diaz - Cuban American, The Apprentice 5 contestant
 Sandra Diaz-Twine - Puerto Rican American, Survivor: Pearl Islands Winner
 Jennifer Fuentes - Cuban American, American Idol (season 2) contestant
 Nathan Gonzalez - Cuban American, Survivor: Cook Islands contestant
 Jaslene Gonzalez - Puerto Rican American, America's Next Top Model (season 8) Winner
 David Hernandez - Mexican American, American Idol (season 7) contestant
 Adriel Herrera - Mexican American, American Idol (season 1) contestant
 Allison Iraheta - American Idol contestant; Salvadoran American
 Danny Jimenez - Cuban American, The Amazing Race 2 and The Amazing Race 11 contestant
 Oscar (Ozzy) Lusth - Mexican American, runner-up, Survivor: Cook Islands runner-up, Survivor: Micronesia contestant
 Ashley Massaro - Cuban American, Survivor: China contestant, WWE Diva, Playboy Cover Girl
 Oswald Mendez - Cuban American, The Amazing Race 2 and The Amazing Race 11 contestant
 Naima Mora - Mexican American, America's Next Top Model (season 4) Winner
 Lydia Morales - Puerto Rican American, Survivor: Guatemala contestant
 Cesar Millan - Mexican American, Star of "Dog Whisperer"
 Danny Noriega - Mexican American, American Idol (season 7) contestant
 Jorge Nuñez - Puerto Rican American, American Idol (season 8) contestant
 Tito Ortiz - Mexican American, contestant on The Apprentice (U.S. Season 7), mixed martial arts fighter
 Janu Tornell - Cuban American, Survivor: Palau contestant
 Mario Vazquez - Puerto Rican American, American Idol contestant, semi-finalist
 Nick Verreos - Venezuelan American, Project Runway contestant
 Rita Verreos - Venezuelan American, Survivor: Fiji contestant

Fashion 
Christy Turlington, fashion model; Salvadoran American
Marisol Deluna, fashion designer; Spanish American
Carolina Herrera, fashion designer; Venezuelan American
Yoanna House, fashion model; Mexican American
Jaslene Gonzalez, fashion model; Puerto Rican
Naima Mora, fashion model; Mexican American
Oscar de la Renta, fashion designer; Dominican American

Business
 Hector Ruiz, Chairman and CEO of AMD Advanced Micro Devices
 Ralph Alvarez, President and CEO of McDonald's Corporation.
Michael Cordúa, restaurateur, entrepreneur, businessman, award-winning self-taught chef; Nicaraguan American*
 Roberto Goizueta, former CEO of Coca-Cola.
Raul J. Fernandez, entrepreneur, CEO and Chairman of ObjectVideo, and Co-Owner of the Washington Capitals, Washington Wizards, and Washington Mystics; Cuban-Ecuadorian American
Maria Elena Lagomasino, former CEO of JP Morgan Private Bank
 David Martinez, managing partner of Fintech Advisory
 Arte Moreno, first Hispanic owner of a Major League Baseball club.
George Muñoz, President of Muñoz Investment Banking Group, LLC.
Michele Ruiz, founder, President and CEO of SaberHacer.com
 Joseph A. Unanue, founder and former president of Goya Foods.
 Richard Velazquez, first Puerto Rican automotive designer for Porsche, first Puerto Rican Xbox Product Planner, co-founder and President of NSHMBA Seattle.
 Maria Vizcarrondo-De Soto, President and CEO of the United Way of Essex and West Hudson
Luis von Ahn, computer scientist known as one of the pioneers of the idea of crowdsourcing. Founder of the company reCAPTCHA, which was sold to Google in 2009; Guatemalan American

Civil activists
Carlos Cadena, activist; Mexican American
Sal Castro, activist
César Chávez, labor leader; Mexican American
Linda Chavez-Thompson, labor leader; Mexican American
Angelo Falcón, political scientist; President and Founder, National Institute for Latino Policy
Hector P. Garcia, activist; Mexican American
Gustavo C. Garcia, activist; Mexican American
Rodolfo Gonzales, activist; Mexican American
John J. Herrera, activist; Mexican American
Dolores Huerta, labor leader; Mexican American
Nativo Lopez, activist; Mexican American
Angel G. Luévano, labor leader; Mexican American
Camilo Mejía, former Staff Sergeant of the Florida National Guard and anti-war activist; Nicaraguan American
Lloyd Monserratt, California political and community leader
Eugene Nelson, labor leader
Baldemar Velasquez, activist; Mexican American

Education
Jaime Escalante, teacher; Bolivian American
Richard A. Tapia, member of the National Science Board, the governing board of the National Science Foundation

Religion
Miguel D'Escoto, Roman Catholic priest and former foreign minister; Nicaraguan American
 Patrick Flores, former Roman Catholic Archbishop of San Antonio, Texas. He was the first Hispanic archbishop in the United States.
 Elias Gabriel Galvan, Bishop of the United Methodist Church
Miguel A. De La Torre, Professor of Social Ethics and author of numerous books on Hispanic religiosity; Cuban American

Architects
 Monica Ponce de Leon, first Hispanic architect to receive the National Design Award in Architecture from the Smithsonian; has received over 12 Progressive Architecture Awards and the Design Award Medal from the Academy of Arts and Letters; first Hispanic dean at the University of Michigan
 Joseph Phillip Martinez, first Mexican-American in the 20th century to receive a Master of Architecture degree from Harvard University.  He was the founding Dean at The New School of Architecture; he previously taught at UC Berkeley. His broad professional practice has garnered various awards including a National AIA Presidential Award, Normal Heights Restoration Plan, and a National AIA Citation, Cesar E. Chavez Elementary School. He was named by the National Association of Land Grant Universities and Colleges as Alumni of the Century for the University of California San Diego—only other Mexican-American honored was Henry Cisneros from Texas A&M University. He was honored with a Lifetime Achievement Award from California Rural Legal Assistance; moreover, he was honored by Barrio Station with a Lifetime Achievement Award. For more than 40 years his Eclectic Design Methodology has resulted in a portfolio of unique works of Architecture, he is the “Father of Chicano Architecture”. In addition to professional practice, he is a staff writer for ByDesign E-magazine via UC Berkeley College of Environmental Design.

Sports

Baseball 

 Dennis Martínez - Pitcher, Perfect Game. Nicaraguan-American

 Felipe Alou - player, manager; Dominican
 Frank Arellanes - MLB player
 Jorge Cantú - MLB infielder
 Eric Chavez - MLB third baseman
 Roberto Clemente - Hall of Fame outfielder
 Marvin Benard - MLB player; Nicaraguan American
Chad Cordero - MLB relief pitcher
Pat Corrales - MLB player, manager, and coach
 Edwin Encarnacion - MLB third baseman
Johnny Estrada - MLB catcher
 Andre Ethier - MLB outfielder
 Brian Fuentes - MLB relief pitcher, 3 time All-Star
 Rafael Furcal - MLB baseball player
 Mike Garcia (AL pitcher) - MLB pitcher
 Nomar Garciaparra - MLB infielder
 Lefty Gomez - MLB pitcher, Hall of Fame member
 Adrian Gonzalez - MLB infielder
Eddie Guardado - MLB pitcher
Keith Hernandez - baseball player
 Adam LaRoche - MLB first baseman
 Andy LaRoche - MLB infielder
 Evan Longoria - MLB infielder
 Juan Marichal - hall of fame
Buck Martinez - MLB player, manager, and commentator
 Sid Monge - MLB relief pitcher, All Star
Carlos Muñiz - MLB relief pitcher
 Sandy Nava - first Mexican American player in the Major Leagues, infielder
Jesse Orosco - MLB pitcher
 Jorge Orta - MLB second baseman
Manny Parra - MLB pitcher
 David Ortiz - MLB designated hitter; Dominican American
 Óliver Pérez - New York Mets Pitcher; Mexican American
 Albert Pujols - baseball player; Dominican American
 Carlos Quentin - MLB outfielder; Mexican American
Omar Quintanilla - MLB player, shortstop
Horacio Ramírez - pitcher; Mexican American
 Manny Ramirez - baseball player; Dominican American
Rudy Regalado - MLB infielder; Mexican American
Anthony Reyes - MLB pitcher; Mexican American
 Jose Reyes - baseball player; Dominican American
Alex Rodriguez - baseball player
Rich Rodriguez (L.H. pitcher) - MLB pitcher
 Freddy Sanchez - MLB infielder; Mexican American
 Alfonso Soriano - baseball player; Dominican American
 Miguel Tejada - Dominican American
Mike Torrez - MLB player pitcher
Fernando Viña - MLB second baseman
Ted Williams - Hall of Fame third baseman with the Boston Red Sox; half-Mexican American
Michael Young - baseball player

Basketball 
 Manu Ginobili, NBA player
 Luis Scola, NBA player
 Fabricio Oberto, NBA player
 Carlos Delfino, NBA player
 Wálter Herrmann, NBA player
 Andres Nocioni, NBA player
 Al Cueto, NBA player
 Andres Guibert, NBA player
 Gilbert Arenas, NBA player
 Lazaro Borrell, NBA player
 Rebecca Lobo, WNBA player
 Brook Lopez, NBA player
 Robin Lopez, NBA player
 Francisco García, NBA player
 Al Horford, NBA player
 Tito Horford, NBA player
 Charlie Villanueva, NBA player
 Luis Flores, NBA player
 Felipe López, NBA player
 Eduardo Najera, NBA player
 Earl Watson, NBA player
 Mark Aguirre, NBA player
 Horacio Llamas, NBA player
  Rolando Blackman, NBA player; Panamanian American
  Ruben Garces, NBA player; Panamanian American
  Stuart Gray, NBA player; Panamanian American
 Carmelo Anthony, NBA player
 Carlos Arroyo, NBA player
 José Juan Barea, NBA player
 Guillermo Diaz, NBA player
 Butch Lee, NBA player
 Jose "Piculin" Ortiz, NBA player
 Peter John Ramos, NBA player
 Ramon Rivas, NBA player
 Daniel Santiago, NBA player
 Esteban Batista, NBA player
 Trevor Ariza, NBA player
 Óscar Torres, NBA player
 Carl Herrera, NBA player

Boxing 
 Paulie Ayala - world champion boxer
 Gaby Canizales - bantamweight world champion boxer
 Orlando Canizales - bantamweight world champion boxer
 Michael Carbajal
 Bobby Chacon - boxer
 Rocky Juarez
Diego Corrales - super featherweight and lightweight champion; Mexican-Colombian American
 Juan Díaz - WBA and WBO and IBF world lightweight champion
 Robert Guerrero - boxer, current IBF featherweight champion
 Genaro Hernandez - boxer, super featherweight champion
 Robert Garcia - boxer, IBF featherweight title
 Delia Gonzalez - boxer
 Paul Gonzales - boxer
 Genaro Hernandez - boxer, super featherweight champion
 Oscar De La Hoya - boxer, promoter
David Obregon - professional boxer; Nicaraguan American
 Manuel Ortiz (boxer) - professional boxer
 Sergio Mora - boxer 
 John Ruiz - boxer
 Mia St. John - boxer
 Johnny Tapia - boxer
 Fernando Vargas - boxer
 Miguel Cotto - boxer
 Wilfredo Gómez - boxer
 Wilfred Benítez - boxer
 Héctor Camacho - boxer
 Edwin Rosario - boxer
 Juan Manuel Lopez - boxer
 Iván Calderón - boxer
 Félix Trinidad - boxer
 Yuriorkis Gamboa - boxer
 Yan Bartelemí - boxer
 Kid Chocolate - boxer
 José Nápoles - boxer
 Kid Gavilan - boxer
 Joel Casamayor - boxer
 Guillermo Rigondeaux - boxer
 Canelo Álvarez - Mexican professional boxer

American Football 
Raul Allegre - NFL placekicker
Tony Casillas - retired NFL defensive lineman
Tom Fears - NFL wide receiver; Mexican American
Tom Flores - NFL coach
Jeff Garcia - football quarterback
Joe Kapp - retired NFL quarterback; Mexican American
J. P. Losman - NFL quarterback; Mexican American
Max Montoya - retired NFL guard
Knowshon Moreno - NFL running back (Denver Broncos); Mexican American
Zeke Moreno - former NFL linebacker
Anthony Muñoz - retired NFL offensive guard, member of Pro Football Hall of Fame; Mexican American
Jim Plunkett - quarterback; Mexican American
Tony Romo - quarterback (Dallas Cowboys); Mexican American
Mark Sanchez - quarterback (New York Jets); Mexican American
Jose Cortez - football placekicker
Roberto Garza - offensive line left guard (Chicago Bears); Mexican American

Golf 
Nancy Lopez; Mexican American
Tony Lema
Chi Chi Rodriguez; Puerto Rican (American)
Lee Trevino; Mexican American
Camilo Villegas; Colombian American
Lorena Ochoa; Mexican American

Martial artists 
 Paul Buentello - UFC, Mixed martial arts
 Carlos Condit - UFC / Mixed martial arts fighter
 Nathan Diaz - Mixed martial artist
 Nick Diaz - UFC / mixed martial arts
 Efrain Escudero - UFC / Mixed martial arts fighter
 Leonard Garcia - WEC, Mixed martial arts
Roger Huerta - mixed martial arts fighter; Mexican-Salvadoran American
 Juanito Ibarra - Mixed martial arts fighter/boxing trainer
Diana López - Taekwondo
Mark López - Taekwondo
Ruby Lopez - Taekwondo
Steven López - Taekwondo, 2 time gold medalist, the most decorated Taekwondo athlete in the history of the sport
 Gilbert Melendez - UFC / Mixed martial arts fighter
 Tito Ortiz - UFC / Mixed martial arts
 Damacio Page - UFC / Mixed martial arts fighter
 Manny Rodriguez - Mixed martial arts fighter/Heavyweight Champion
 Diego Sanchez - UFC / Mixed martial arts
 Eddie Sanchez - Mixed martial arts fighter
 Frank Shamrock - UFC / Mixed martial arts fighter
 Mia St. John - Taekwondo champion and boxer
 Miguel Torres - WEC / Mixed martial arts fighter
 Charlie Valencia - Mixed martial arts fighter
Javier Vazquez - WEC / Mixed martial arts fighter
 Cain Velasquez - UFC / Mixed martial arts fighter
 Joey Villasenor - Mixed martial arts fighter

Football 
Esteban Arias - defender C.D. Chivas USA
Chris Armas - soccer player
Ivan Becerra - soccer forward for Columbus Crew
Carlos Bocanegra - MLS soccer
 Cuauhtemoc Blanco - defender Chicago Fire
Jonathan Bornstein - defender and midfielder C.D. Chivas USA
Jose Burciaga Jr. - Major League Soccer
Edgar Eduardo Castillo - defender Santos Laguna
Ramiro Corrales - San Jose Earthquakes
Jorge Flores - C.D. Chivas USA
José Francisco Torres - midfielder Pachuca
Francisco Gomez - USL Premier Development League
Herculez Gomez - Colorado Rapids Major League Soccer
Miguel Gonzalez - New England Revolution Major League Soccer
Sonny Guadarrama - midfielder for Atlético Morelia
Diego Gutierrez - midfielder Major League Soccer
Brad Guzan - goalkeeper MLS Chivas USA
Daniel Hernandez - Major League Soccer
Christian Jimenez - MLS player
Freddy Juarez - defender Carolina RailHawks
Rodrigo López (soccer) - midfielder C.D. Chivas USA
Antonio Martínez - midfielder C.D. Chivas USA
Pablo Mastroeni - defensive midfielder Colorado Rapids
Mike Muñoz (soccer player) - midfielder USL First Division
Michael Orozco Fiscal - defender for San Luis F.C.
Jesús Padilla - forward C.D. Guadalajara
Shea Salinas - forward San Jose Earthquakes
Orlando Perez - C.D. Chivas USA
Antonio de la Torre - defender for the Atlanta Silverbacks USL First Division
Arturo Torres - soccer player
Tab Ramos - soccer player
José Francisco Torres - midfielder Primera Division de Mexico
Martin Vasquez - retired midfielder, assistant coach C.D. Chivas USA
Guillermo Ochoa -  Mexican professional footballer who plays as a goalkeeper for Liga MX club América

Wrestlers 
 Aaron Aguilera - professional wrestler
 The Bella Twins - professional wrestlers
 Chavo Guerrero Jr. - WCW, ECW and WWE
 Eddie Guerrero - WWE
 Hector Guerrero - professional wrestler
 Mando Guerrero - professional wrestler
Gino Hernandez - professional wrestler
 Jessica Martin - professional wrestler
Candice Michelle - professional wrestler; Costa Rican American
 Rey Mysterio Jr. - WWE
 Melina Perez - professional wrestler
Milena Roucka - professional wrestler; Costa Rican American
 Tito Santana - WWF wrestler
 José Luis Jair Soria - professional wrestler
 Enrique Torres - professional wrestler
Eve Torres - WWE Diva; Nicaraguan American
Alicia Fox - WWE Diva; Dominican-Panamanian American

Other sports 
Benjamin Agosto - figure skater
Tony Alva - legendary skateboarder; Mexican American
Rudy Galindo - figure skater
Scott Gomez - hockey player
Pancho Gonzalez - tennis player; Mexican American
Roberto Guerrero - racing driver
George Hincapie - road bicyclist; Colombian American
Juan Pablo Montoya - car racer (Formula One and NASCAR)
Derek Parra - speed skater, Olympic gold medalist; Mexican American
Stacy Peralta - legendary skateboarder; Mexican American
Paul Rodriguez Jr. - professional skateboarder; Mexican American
Alberto Salazar - marathoner, coach until he was banned for life
Ismael Valenzuela - jockey, Kentucky Derby winner
Patrick Valenzuela - jockey, Kentucky Derby and Preakness winner

Politics 
 Ted Cruz – United States Senator representing Texas and first Hispanic American to hold that position

 Blanca Alvarado – politician, served on City Council and Board of Supervisors for San Jose, California
 Alex Blanco – politician, mayor of Passaic, New Jersey
 Fernando Cabrera – New York City Council member
 Nelson Castro – politician from the state of New York
 Lorraine Cortés-Vázquez – 65th Secretary of State of New York, serving in the Cabinet of Governor David Paterson
 Marcos Devers – member of the Massachusetts House of Representatives
 Grace Diaz – politician, Democratic State Representative from Rhode Island representing District 11 in the city of Providence, Rhode Island
 Adriano Espaillat – member of the United States House of Representatives
 Rafael Espinal – politician who won the open 54th district seat in the New York State Assembly in a special election held on September 13, 2011
 Julissa Ferreras – Democratic member of the New York City Council
 Nick Fuentes – Paleoconservative commentator and internet personality
Frances Garcia – former mayor of Hutchinson, Kansas
 Norma García – former mayor of Mercedes, Texas and Hidalgo County treasurer
 William Lantigua – politician in Massachusetts, Dominican born and raised
 Guillermo Linares – Dominican Democratic member of the New York State Assembly
 Miguel Martinez – former New York City Council member from Council District 10 in Upper Manhattan in New York City
 Alexandria Ocasio-Cortez – member of the United States House of Representatives, youngest women ever elected to the U.S house.
 Joseline Peña-Melnyk – politician, represents District 21 in the Maryland House of Delegates
Geovanny Vicente Romero – Hispanic political analyst, Professor and international consultant based in Washington, D.C.
 Cesar A. Perales – Secretary of State of New York currently serving in the Cabinet of Governor Andrew Cuomo
 Thomas Perez – Democratic National Committee Chairman, Assistant Attorney General for Civil Rights, US Secretary of Labor-designate; parents are Dominicans
 Ydanis Rodríguez – currently a Democratic New York City Council member from the borough of Manhattan
Marco Rubio – United States Senator representing Florida
 Angel Taveras – lawyer and mayor of Providence, Rhode Island; of Dominican descent; first Hispanic mayor of the city
Julián Castro – 2020 Democratic Party nominee for President of the United States; 16th United States Secretary of Housing and Urban Development from 2014 to 2017; mayor San Antonio, Texas from 2009 until 2014.

Models
 Melanie Iglesias

Scientists
Joseph M. Acabá, American astronaut of Puerto Rican descent
Luis Walter Alvarez (1911–1988), American experimental physicist, inventor, and professor who was awarded the Nobel Prize in Physics in 1968 for development of the hydrogen bubble chamber
Walter Clement Alvarez medicine doctor, author of books on medicine
Walter Alvarez, geologist, postulator of the asteroid-impact theory for the Cretaceous-Tertiary extinction event
Serena M. Auñón, astronaut
 Elsa Salazar Cade, Mexican American entomologist and educator
 Fernando Caldeiro, Argentine American astronaut
 Franklin Chang-Diaz, Costa Rican American astronaut
France A. Córdova, former NASA chief scientist (Mexican American)
Frank J. Duarte, laser physicist and author
Martha E. Bernal (1931–2001), Mexican-American clinical psychologist, first Latina to receive a psychology PhD in the United States
Antonia Novello (b. 1944), Puerto Rican physician, 14th Surgeon General of the United States, first woman and first Hispanic to hold the position
Sarah Stewart (1905–1976), Mexican-American microbiologist; discovered the Polyomavirus
Helen Rodríguez Trías (1929–2001), Puerto Rican American pediatrician, advocate for women's reproductive rights
Melba J. T. Vasquez (b. 1951), counseling psychologist and first Latina president of the American Psychological Association
Lydia Villa-Komaroff (b. 1947), Mexican-American cellular biologist; third Mexican American woman in the United States to receive a PhD in the sciences
Rodolfo Llinas (b. 1934), Colombian American neuroscientist
John Garcia, psychologist
Sidney M. Gutierrez, Mexican American astronaut
Jose Hernández, Mexican American astronaut
Christopher Loria, astronaut
Todd Martinez, Theoretical chemist and MacArthur Fellow
Mario Molina, Nobel Prize-winning chemist (Mexican American)
Carlos I. Noriega, Mexican American astronaut
Ellen Ochoa, Mexican American astronaut
John D. Olivas, Mexican American astronaut
George D. Zamka, Colombian American astronaut

Journalism
 Jacqueline Alemany, journalist
 Cecilia Alvear, television journalist; Ecuadorian American
 María Celeste Arrarás, journalist and TV news presenter
 Julie Banderas, TV news presenter
  Bárbara Bermudo, journalist and TV news presenter
 Ilia Calderón, television journalist; Colombian American
 Rachel Campos-Duffy, television news host
 María Antonieta Collins, journalist and TV news presenter
 Jose Diaz-Balart, journalist and TV news presenter
 Carmen Dominicci, television journalist
 Patricio G. Espinoza, freelance journalist; Ecuadorian American
 Giselle Fernández, television journalist
 Luis de la Garza, TV and radio host
 Juan Gonzalez, investigative journalist
 Cork Graham, imprisoned in Vietnam for illegally entering the country while looking for treasure buried by Captain Kidd; Ecuadorian American
 Kimberly Guilfoyle, TV news presenter
 Maria Hinojosa, journalist
 Bryan Llenas, television news reporter
 Lynda Lopez, journalist and TV news presenter
  Maria Molina, television meteorologist and journalist
 Natalie Morales, television journalist
 Soledad O'Brien, newscaster (Cuban from her maternal side)
 Raul Peimbert, television journalist
 Satcha Pretto, journalist and television news presenter; Honduran American
 John Quiñones, television journalist
 Jorge Ramos, journalist and TV news presenter
 Birmania Ríos, television journalist; Dominican American
 Geraldo Rivera, talk-show host, journalist
 Maggie Rodriguez television journalist
 Michele Ruiz newscaster; Panamanian American journalist and TV news presenter
 María Elena Salinas, journalist and TV news presenter
 Maria Elvira Salazar, journalist and TV news presenter
 Rubén Salazar, legendary slain journalist
 Lauren Sánchez, newscaster
 Rick Sanchez, newscaster
 Cristina Saralegui, journalist and TV show host
 Pedro Sevcec, journalist and TV news presenter
 Carley Shimkus, TV news presenter
 Ray Suarez, television and radio journalist
 Hector Tobar, Pulitzer Prize-winning journalist; Guatemalan American
 Elizabeth Vargas, television journalist

Literature

 Mercedes de Acosta (1893–1968) – poet and playwright, also known for her lesbian affairs with Greta Garbo and Marlene Dietrich.
 Felipe Alfau (1902–1999) – Catalan novelist and poet.
Rudolfo Anaya (1937–2020) – Mexican-American author of Bless Me, Ultima
 Jaime de Angulo (1887–1950) – linguist, novelist, and ethnomusicologist in the western United States. He was born in Paris of Spanish parents.
 Estelle Anna Lewis (1824–1880) – United States poet and dramatist. She was of English and Spanish descent.
 Ivan Argüelles – American poet and brother of Jose Argüelles.
 Alexander Argüelles – American linguist and son of Ivan Argüelles.
Miguel Algarín (1941–2020) – Puerto Rican author and co-founder of the Nuyorican Poets Café
Julia Alvarez – writer; Dominican American
Jimmy Santiago Baca – poet; Mexican American
 Hilario Barrero – Spanish poet and teacher.
 Stephen Vincent Benét (July 22, 1898 – March 13, 1943) – American author, poet, short story writer, and novelist.
Giannina Braschi (b. 1953) – Puerto Rican author of Spanglish classic novel Yo-Yo Boing!
Fray Angelico Chavez – poet, historian, painter
Sandra Cisneros (b. 1954) – Mexican-American author of The House on Mango Street
Judith Ortiz Cofer (1952–2016) – Puerto Rican author of Silent Dancing: A Partial Remembrance of a Puerto Rican Childhood
Angie Cruz (b. 1972) – Dominican-American author of Let It Rain Coffee
Nelson Denis (b. 1954) – Puerto Rican author of War Against All Puerto Ricans and former New York State Assemblyman
Junot Diaz – writer; Dominican American
Francisco Goldman – writer; Guatemalan American
 Manuel Gonzales (1913–1993) – Spanish born-American Disney comics artist.
 Jessica Hagedorn – Filipino-American playwright, writer, poet, storyteller, musician, and multimedia performance artist, to a Scots-Irish-French-Filipino mother and a Filipino-Spanish father.
Oscar Hijuelos – Cuban-American writer
 Amber L. Hollibaugh – American writer, film-maker and political activist. She is the daughter of a Romany father of Spanish descent and an Irish mother.
 Christianne Meneses Jacobs – publisher of the only U.S. Spanish-language children's magazine; Nicaraguan American
 Andrew Jolivétte – American author and lecturer of Spanish partially descent.
 Lynda Lopez – author and journalist based in New York City
Patricia Santos Marcantonio – Mexican-American novelist and short story writer
 Odón Betanzos Palacios (1925–2007) – poet, novelist and Spanish literary critic.
 Carmen M. Pursifull – English-language free verse poet and former New York City Latin dance and Latin American music figure in the 1950s. She is of Puerto Rican and Spanish descent.
 Anaïs Nin – born Angela Anaïs Juana Antolina Rosa Edelmira Nin y Culmell, was an American author born to Spanish-Cuban parents in France, where she was also raised.
Horacio Peña – professor, writer, and poet; Nicaraguan American
 George Rabasa – American writer and author
 Matthew Randazzo V – American true crime writer and historian. He is of Sicilian-American, Isleño, and Cajun descent.
Alberto Rios (b. 1952) – Mexican-American poet, Arizona's first poet first state poet laureate
Benjamin Alire Sáenz (b. 1954) – Mexican-American author of Everything Begins and Ends at the Kentucky Club
 George Santayana (1863–1952) – Spanish born, philosopher, essayist, poet, and novelist.
Luis Senarens (1865–1939) – Cuban-American science fiction author of The Frank Reade Library, the most popular sci-fi Dime Novel series of the 19th century.
Sergio Troncoso (b. 1961) – Mexican-American author of The Last Tortilla and Other Stories and Crossing Borders: Personal Essays
 Geovanny Vicente – political strategist, international consultant and columnist who writes for CNN.
 Jose Yglesias (November 29, 1919 – November 7, 1995) – American novelist and journalist. Yglesias was born in the Ybor City section of Tampa, Florida, and was of Cuban and Spanish descent. His father was from Galicia.
 Rafael Yglesias (born May 12, 1954, New York) – American novelist and screenwriter. His parents were the novelists Jose Yglesias and Helen Yglesias.

United States Armed Forces
 Joseph B. Avilés (1897–1990), served in the U.S. Navy and later in the Coast Guard; in 1925, became the first Hispanic Chief Petty Officer in the US Coast Guard; Puerto Rican, lived in Maryland
 Rafael Celestino Benítez (1917–1999), highly decorated submarine commander who led the rescue effort of the crew members of the USS Cochino during the Cold War
 José M. Cabanillas (1901–1979), Puerto Rican executive Officer of the USS Texas, which participated in the invasions of North Africa and the Battle of Normandy (D-Day) during World War II; died in Virginia
 Iván Castro, U.S. Army officer who has continued serving on active duty in the Special Forces despite losing his eyesight; parents are Puerto Rican
 Joseph H. De Castro (1844–1892), first Hispanic American to be awarded the Medal of Honor
 Richard Carmona, American physician and public health administrator
 Adolfo Fernández Cavada, captain in the Union Army during the American Civil War who later served as Commander-in-Chief of the Cinco Villas during Cuba's Ten Year War
Federico Fernández Cavada, colonel in the Union Army during the American Civil War and later Commander-in-Chief of all the Cuban forces during Cuba's Ten Year War
 Mercedes O. Cubria, lieutenant colonel in the U.S. Army; first Cuban-born female officer in the US Army
 Julius Peter Garesché, lieutenant colonel in the Union Army who served as Chief of Staff, with the rank of Lieutenant Colonel to Maj. Gen. William S. Rosecrans
 Ambrosio José Gonzales, colonel in the Confederate Army during the American Civil War
 José Manuel Hernández, popular Venezuelan caudillo, army general, congressman, presidential candidate and cabinet member who was also involved in numerous insurrections. Lived in exile in US from 1911 to his death in 1921
 Narciso López, Venezuelan soldier and adventurer, known for four filibuster expeditions aimed at liberating Cuba from Spain in the 1850s
 Carmen Contreras-Bozak (1919–2017), first Hispanic to serve in the U.S. Women's Army Corps, where she served as an interpreter and in numerous administrative positions; Puerto Rican; lives in Tampa, Florida
 Linda García Cubero, former U.S. Air Force officer; of Mexican-American-Puerto Rican descent
 Rubén A. Cubero, highly decorated member of the U.S. Air Force; first Hispanic graduate of the US Air Force Academy to be named Dean of the Faculty of the academy; parents were Puerto Rican
 Alberto Díaz Jr., first Hispanic Director of the San Diego Naval District and Balboa Naval Hospital; Puerto Rican born and raised
 Rafael O'Ferrall, United States Army officer; first Hispanic of Puerto Rican descent to become the Deputy Commanding General for the Joint Task Force at Guantanamo Bay, Cuba
 Salvador E. Felices (1923–1987), first Puerto Rican to reach the rank of major general (two-star) in the U.S. Air Force; died in Florida
 Diego E. Hernández, retired US Navy officer; first Hispanic to be named Vice Commander, North American Aerospace Defense Command; Puerto Rican resident of Miami
 Lester Martínez López, MD, MPH (born 1955), first Hispanic to head the Army Medical and Research Command at Fort Detrick, Maryland
 Carlos Lozada (1946–1967) member of the U.S. Army; one of five Puerto Ricans who posthumously received the Medal of Honor for their actions in combat; Puerto Rican born, raised in New York City
 Ángel Méndez (1946–1967) U.S. Marine, posthumously awarded the Navy Cross
 Virgil Rasmuss Miller (1900–1968), U.S. Army officer who served as Regimental Commander of the 442d Regimental Combat Team, a unit composed of "Nisei" (second generation Americans of Japanese descent), during World War II
 Héctor Andrés Negroni, Puerto Rican historian, senior aerospace defense executive, author; first Puerto Rican graduate of the U.S. Air Force Academy; lives in Vienna, Virginia
 Antonia Novello, Puerto Rican physician and public health administrator; US Surgeon General
 María Inés Ortiz (1967–2007), first American nurse to die in combat during Operation Iraqi Freedom; first Army nurse to die in combat since the Vietnam War; parents were Puerto Rican

 José Antonio Páez, Venezuelan leader who fought the War of Independence. President of Venezuela once it was independent of the Gran Colombia (1830–1835; 1839–1843; 1861–1863). He lived in New York City during his years in exile and died there in 1873
 Patricia Spanic, captain in the US Army. She is sister of soap opera actress Gabriela Spanic.
 Erneido Oliva, major general; former deputy commander of the D.C. National Guard
 Marion Frederic Ramírez de Arellano (1913–1980), submarine commander in the US Navy; first Hispanic submarine commanding officer
 Frederick Lois Riefkohl (1889–1969), Puerto Rican officer in the U.S. Navy; first Puerto Rican to graduate from the U.S. Naval Academy and to be awarded the Navy Cross; lived and died in Florida
 Rudolph W. Riefkohl (1885–1950), U.S. Army officer; instrumental in helping the people of Poland overcome the 1919 typhus epidemic
 Manuel Rivera Jr. (1959–1991), first American serviceman of Puerto Rican descent to die in Operation Desert Shield
 Pedro N. Rivera, retired Puerto Rican US Air Force officer; in 1994 became the first Hispanic medical commander in the Air Force; lives in Alexandria, Virginia
 Elmelindo Rodrigues Smith (1935–1967), U.S. Army soldier posthumously awarded the Medal of Honor for his actions in the Vietnam War; of Puerto Rican descent
 Augusto Rodríguez, Puerto Rican officer in the Union Army during the American Civil War; immigrated to the US in the 1850s
 Pedro Rodríguez (1912–1999), earned two Silver Stars within a seven-day period during the Korean War; Puerto Rican; died in Washington, D.C.
 Fernando E. Rodríguez Vargas (1888–1932), Puerto Rican odontologist (dentist), scientist and a major in the US Army; discovered the bacteria which causes cavities; died in Washington, D.C.
 Félix Rodríguez, U.S. Army helicopter pilot, former CIA officer known for his involvement in the Bay of Pigs Invasion and his involvement in the capture and interrogation of Che Guevara
 Lola Sánchez, Confederate spy during the American Civil War; played an instrumental role in the Confederate victory in the Battle of Horse Landing
 José Agustín Quintero, Cuban born Confederate diplomat to Mexico, based in Monterrey
 Loreta Janeta Velazquez (1842 – c. 1902), aka Lieutenant Harry Buford, Cuban-born woman who claimed that she masqueraded as a male Confederate soldier during the American Civil War
 Héctor E. Pagán, U.S. Army officer; first Hispanic of Puerto Rican descent to become Deputy Commanding General of the US Army John F. Kennedy Special Warfare Center and School at Fort Bragg, North Carolina
 José M. Portela, retired officer of the U.S. Air Force; served in the position of Assistant Adjutant General for Air while also serving as commander of the Puerto Rico Air National Guard
 Maritza Sáenz Ryan, U.S. Army officer; head of the Department of Law at the US Military Academy; first woman and first Hispanic West Point graduate to serve as an academic department head; Puerto Rican father, Spanish mother
 Héctor Santiago-Colón (1942–1968), one of five Puerto Ricans posthumously presented with the Medal of Honor, the highest military decoration awarded by the U.S.; Puerto Rican from New York
 Frances M. Vega (1983–2003), first female soldier of Puerto Rican descent to die in a combat zone, in Operation Iraqi Freedom
 Pedro del Valle (1893–1978), U.S. Marine Corps officer; first Hispanic to reach the rank of lieutenant general; in 1900 his family emigrated to the US and became US citizens
 Humbert Roque Versace (1937–1965), American U.S. Army officer of Puerto Rican-Italian descent; awarded the US' highest military decoration, the Medal of Honor, for his heroic actions while a prisoner of war during the Vietnam War

See also
List of Argentine Americans
List of Bolivian Americans
List of Brazilian Americans
List of Colombian Americans
List of Cuban Americans
List of Dominican Americans
List of Mexican Americans
List of Nicaraguan Americans
List of Salvadoran Americans
List of Venezuelan Americans
List of Spanish Americans
List of Stateside Puerto Ricans
History of Mexican Americans
List of Hispanic and Latino Medal of Honor recipients
Hispanic and Latino Admirals in the United States Navy
Hispanics and Latinos in the United States Air Force
Hispanics and Latinos in the United States Coast Guard
Hispanics and Latinos in the United States Marine Corps
Hispanics and Latinos in the United States Navy
Hispanics and Latinos in the American Civil War
Hispanic and Latino American writers
List of Hispanic and Latin American Britons

References

57. ^Jenni Rivera

!
Lists of American people by ethnic or national origin

Hispanic